Dimitrios Senikidis is a Greek Paralympic athlete with an intellectual disability competing in shot put events. He represented Greece at the 2016 Summer Paralympics held in Rio de Janeiro, Brazil and he won the silver medal in the men's shot put F20 event.

Career 

He represented Greece at the 2010 Summer Youth Olympics held in Singapore. He competed in the boys' shot put event. At the 2015 IPC Athletics World Championships held in Doha, Qatar, he won the silver medal in the men's shot put F20 event. The following year, he won the gold medal in the men's shot put F20 event at the 2016 IPC Athletics European Championships held in Grosseto, Italy.

Achievements

References

External links 
 

Living people
Year of birth missing (living people)
Place of birth missing (living people)
Greek male shot putters
Paralympic athletes of Greece
Intellectual Disability category Paralympic competitors
Athletes (track and field) at the 2010 Summer Youth Olympics
Athletes (track and field) at the 2016 Summer Paralympics
Medalists at the 2016 Summer Paralympics
Paralympic silver medalists for Greece
Paralympic medalists in athletics (track and field)
21st-century Greek people